Dmitri Olegovich Semashkin (born 21 December 2001) is a Russian football player.

Club career
He made his debut in the Russian Football National League for FC Tekstilshchik Ivanovo on 1 August 2020 in a game against FC Veles Moscow, he substituted Maksim Sidorov in the 81st minute.

References

External links
 
 Profile by Russian Football National League
 

2001 births
Living people
Russian footballers
Association football midfielders
FC Tekstilshchik Ivanovo players